"Welcome Home" is a World War I song written by Bud Green and composed by Edward G. Nelson. The song was first published in 1918 by A.J. Stasny Music Co., in New York, NY. The sheet music cover depicts soldiers being welcomed home by men and women.

The sheet music can be found at the Pritzker Military Museum & Library.

References

Bibliography
 Parker, Bernard S. World War I Sheet Music Vol 2. Jefferson: McFarland & Company, Inc., 2007. . 
 Vogel, Frederick G. World War I Songs: A History and Dictionary of Popular American Patriotic Tunes, with Over 300 Complete Lyrics. Jefferson: McFarland & Company, Inc., 1995. . 

1918 songs
Songs of World War I
Songs with lyrics by Bud Green
Songs with music by Edward G. Nelson